Christopher Bates may refer to:
 Christopher Bates (rower)
 Christopher Bates (fashion designer)

See also
 Chris Bates, American jazz bassist